In Romano-British religion, Cocidius was a deity worshipped in northern Britain. The Romans equated him with Mars, god of war and hunting, and also with Silvanus, god of forests, groves and wild fields. Like Belatucadros, he was probably worshipped by lower-ranked Roman soldiers as well as by the Britons for whom he was probably a tribal god - a genius loci.

Etymology
Rivet and Smith note that the name may be related to British Celtic cocco-, 'red', suggesting that statues of the god might have been painted red:. the figure discovered in the 1980s in the Otterburn Training Area is known as the Red One.

Representations and dedications 

Fanocodi was a Roman place-name mentioned in the Ravenna Cosmography for a location close to the Solway Estuary; the name has been derived from Fanum Cocidii, or temple of Cocidius, and the place identified with Bewcastle. There are dedications to Cocidius around Hadrian's Wall and Cumbria, including the forts at Birdoswald and Bewcastle. Another inscription, at Ebchester, refers to him as Cocidius Vernostonus, Cocidius of the alder tree. A 2000-year-old carving of Cocidius was found in 2006 near Chesters Fort on Hadrian's Wall. This was dubbed the little man and shows a figure with its arms flung wide and legs braced firmly against the ground. Although the gender is not depicted, the shape and accessories are seemingly male, with a shield in the left hand, a sword in the right, and a scabbard hanging from the belt around his tunic. This is one of at least nine representations known in the Hadrian's Wall corridor, and a further 25 or so inscriptions dedicated to him. Most of these are along the western portion of the Wall, the most spectacular being found at Yardhope, where a figure in bas-relief brandishes spear and shield on a vertical rock-face at the entrance to a small shrine.

See also 
Vernostonos, possibly an epithet of Cocidius

References 

Gods of the ancient Britons
War gods
Hunting gods
Nature gods
Horned deities
Martian deities